Byron Cage's album Live At the Apollo: The Proclamation was recorded live at the Apollo Theater on April 26, 2007 with production by PAJAM and featured guests J Moss, Kim Burrell, & Dave Hollister.  The album was released in 2007. "I'm Going Back", was done by The Prince Of Praise in his notable style. This is also his third solo and fifth overall album.

Noted guests included Donald Lawrence, Dr. Bobby Jones, Rodney "Darkchild" Jerkins, and many others. DeWayne Woods, of "Let Go" fame, was director of a choir which included recording artists Crystal Rose and Earnest Pugh.

The album's first single, "With All of My Might" became available on iTunes for download in 2007.

Track listing

References

Byron Cage albums
2007 live albums
Albums recorded at the Apollo Theater